The 1994 World's Strongest Man was the 17th edition of World's Strongest Man and was won by Magnus Ver Magnusson from Iceland. It was his second title after finishing second the previous 2 years in a row. Manfred Hoeberl from Austria finished second after finishing fourth the previous year, and Riku Kiri from Finland finished third for the second consecutive time. The contest was held in Sun City, South Africa. This was the first year that the qualifying heats were implemented, and surprisingly, the 1993 champion Gary Taylor failed to qualify for the finals.

Heats

Group 1

Group 2

Group 3

Group 4

Final results

References

External links
 Official site
 1994 results at Bill Henderson's Strongest Man site

World's Strongest Man
1994 in South African sport